Clifton & Strathfillan Football Club was a Scottish association football club from the village of Tyndrum, Perthshire. The club was founded in 1877 and disbanded three years later in 1880. The club competed in the Scottish Cup for the 1877–78, reaching the second round, and again the following season, losing in the first round. The club's home colours were blue and white hoops with white shorts.

Scottish Cup record

1877–78
 First round: Won 2–1 v. Shaugran, 29 September 1877
 Second round: Lost 0–3 v. Grasshoppers,

1878–79
 First round: Lost 0–1 v. Vale of Teith, 5 October 1878

References 

Defunct football clubs in Scotland
Association football clubs established in 1877
1877 establishments in Scotland
Association football clubs disestablished in 1880
1880 disestablishments in Scotland
Football clubs in Stirling (council area)